Ferronor (Empresa de Transporte Ferroviario S.A.) is a Chilean railway company operating on the old Red Norte (northern network) of Empresa de los Ferrocarriles del Estado, which was privatised in 1997. Since 2004 the primary shareholder is APCO.

However, about 60% of the railway network are currently unused due to damage like landslides, washouts and rail theft. Ferronor mostly transports mining supplies and products.

Ferronor transports 7,000,000 tonnes of iron ore concentrate, 900,000 tonnes of salt, 290,000 tonnes of copper concentrate, 530,000 tonnes of sulfuric acid, 230,000 tonnes of copper cathodes and 35,000 tonnes of fuel annually. Other railway operators transport 2,200,000 tonnes of freight on Ferronor lines annually.

Diego de Almagro division

The Longitudinal Norte is still used from Diego de Almagro northward to connect Mina Franke.

The line was built starting 1916 by the Andes Copper Mining Company to connect the Potrerillos copper mine and smelter with Pueblo Hundido (now called Diego de Almagro), where it connected to the state railway network, which continued to Chañaral. At Chañaral, a branch was built to connect the harbor at Barquito with the state railway network. Production at the mine started ten years later. The railway was subsequently used to transport supplies to Potrerillos and refined copper to the harbor at Barquito.

In 1959, the El Salvador mine opened and the mine at Potrerillos subsequently shut down, however the smelter remained in operation. Since then, the liquified ore is transported by pipeline from El Salvador to a filtration plant near Llanta, from where the dried ore concentrate is transported by railway to the Potrerillos plant.

The copper refining process requires large quantities of sulfuric acid, which is produced on-site at Potrerillos. Potrerillos also supplies other plants with sulfuric acid, both by truck and railway. Facilities to transfer sulfuric acid from train to truck exist at Llanta and El Salado.

Vallenar division
The Vallenar division connects the Los Colorados iron ore mine with the harbor at Huasco. It consists of a branch which connects the mine with the Longitudinal Norte north of Vallenar, which is then used southward to Vallenar. A further branch line then provides the link from Vallenar to Huasco.

Baquedano division
The Baquedano division used to transport natural gas via Palestina and the Socompa pass to Argentina. This traffic ceased in 2006, after two Ferronor locomotives (408 and 412) were damaged in an accident in Argentina and the Argentinian operator Belgrano Cargas initially refused to repair and return the locomotives. The locomotives have since been repaired and returned to service for Ferronor, but traffic over the Socompa pass has not been resumed to date.

Ferronor also owns various steam locomotives and other historic rolling stock, which is on display in an open-air "museum" at Baquedano. However, most of the locomotives are stored outside without any protection and are in very bad condition.

Locomotives
This is an incomplete list of locomotives used by Ferronor.

Gallery

References

External links

 

Railway companies of Chile